Luca Rossettini (born 9 May 1985) is an Italian professional football coach and a former player who played as a centre-back.

Club career

Padova
Rossettini spent his youth years at hometown club Padova.

Siena
Rossettini joined Siena in a co-ownership deal on 28 August 2007 for €1.2 million. The deal was made permanent when Siena bought out the contract from Padova in June 2008 for another €1.2 million.

Cagliari
On 21 June 2012, he was signed by Cagliari for €1.6 million.

Bologna
On 23 June 2015, Rossettini was sold to Bologna for €2.5 million transfer fee.

Torino
On 16 August 2016, Rossettini was sold to Torino F.C.

Genoa
On 18 August 2017, he was sold to Genoa.

Chievo Verona
On 8 August 2018, Rossettini joined to Chievo Verona on loan until 30 June 2019 with an option to buy.

Lecce
On 12 July 2019 he was signed by Lecce.

Return to Padova and retirement
On 12 January 2021 he returned to his first club Padova. On 11 August 2021 he announced his retirement as a player, and was appointed as a U-17 Padova team manager.

International career
In November 2014, Rossettini received his first national team call-up. He was capped once for Italy's Olympic team against the Netherlands Olympic team in February 2008 in a friendly match.

Career statistics

References

External links
 
 A.C. Siena Official Player Profile 
 Gazzetta Dello Sport Player Profile 

1985 births
Living people
Sportspeople from Padua
Italian footballers
Association football defenders
Serie A players
Serie B players
Serie C players
Calcio Padova players
A.C.N. Siena 1904 players
Cagliari Calcio players
Bologna F.C. 1909 players
Torino F.C. players
Genoa C.F.C. players
A.C. ChievoVerona players
U.S. Lecce players
Italy under-21 international footballers
Italy youth international footballers
Footballers from Veneto